Saints Never Surrender was an American band, who primarily played hardcore punk and melodic hardcore styles of music. They were from Fort Wayne, Indiana. The band begun making music and performing locally in 2003. After signing a record deal with Blood and Ink Records in 2007, several nationwide tours and two studio albums, the group officially disbanded in 2009.

Background
Saints Never Surrender was a hardcore band from Fort Wayne, Indiana. They started as a band in 2003 and disbanded in 2009. On April 14, 2012 the band reunited one last time to play the Stand Together Fest in Nashville, Tennessee.

Music history
The band commenced as a musical entity in 2003. Their first release was an extended play entitled Set Our Hearts to Burn, which was released independently by the band on December 13, 2006. Their first studio album Hope for the Best, Prepare for the Worst was released by Blood and Ink Records on May 8, 2007. The subsequent release Brutus was also released with Blood and Ink Records on July 15, 2008.

Members
 Stephen Boyd – drums 
 Jesse Boyd – guitars 
 Tony Biard – vocals 
 Tyler Lebamoff – bass 
 Max Hatlem – guitars 
 Jon Swain - guitars 
 Mason Hunter - vocals 
 Jordan Witzigreuter - drums 
 Dylan Johnstone - vocals 
 Mitchell Green - bass/vocals (2003-2008)

Discography
Studio albums
 Hope for the Best, Prepare for the Worst (May 8, 2007, Blood and Ink)
 Brutus (July 15, 2008, Blood and Ink)
EPs
 Set Our Hearts to Burn (December 13, 2006, Saints Never Surrender)

References

External links
 Facebook profile
 Blood and Ink Records

Musical groups from Indiana
2006 establishments in Indiana
2009 disestablishments in Indiana
Musical groups established in 2006
Musical groups disestablished in 2009
Blood and Ink Records artists